Jay Varma is a physician and epidemiologist who is the senior advisor for public health and COVID-19 to New York City Mayor Bill de Blasio.

In this role, Varma helps lead New York City’s COVID-19 pandemic response, including diagnostic testing, contact tracing, and the phased re-opening of businesses. He is the architect of the NYC plans for public schools during the COVID-19 crisis.

Early life and education
Varma graduated magna cum laude with highest honors from Harvard University. Varma completed medical school, internal medicine residency, and his residency at the University of California San Diego School of Medicine, where he was chief resident.

Career
In 2001, Varma joined the Center for Disease Control’s Epidemic Intelligence Service, working on foodborne diseases. That same year, he led the CDC’s study of an E. coli outbreak at an Ohio county fair, determining the bacteria was spread through sawdust in the air of an Exhibition Hall, the first time scientists connected transmission of E. Coli to a contaminated building.

While working for the CDC on infectious diseases prevention and control, Varma had postings in Atlanta, Thailand, China, Ethiopia, and New York City.
 From 2003 to 2008, Varma directed the CDC’s tuberculosis programs and research in Southeast Asia. From 2008 to 2011, he directed the CDC’s International Emerging Infections Program in Beijing, China.

He became the deputy commissioner of the New York City Department of Health and Mental Hygiene in 2011. In 2014, he acted as the “incident commander” for Ebola in New York after two people tested positive for the virus. Varma authorized the 21 day quarantine of the fiancée and two of friends of a doctor who fell ill with Ebola after he returned from treating patients in Guinea. That same year he led NYC’s response to an outbreak of measles in more than two dozen people and an outbreak of meningitis among gay and bisexual men. He also managed the city’s response to an outbreak of Legionnaires’ Disease cases in 2014-2015 linked to contaminated cooling towers, which sickened dozens of people and killed four.

Varma also worked as the Senior Advisor to the Director of Africa CDC,  assisting with strategy and execution of the Africa Center for Disease Control’s programs and helping develop the African Union’s continent-wide strategy for COVID-19.

During the COVID-19 pandemic, Varma became de Blasio’s senior advisor for public health, after the mayor clashed with NYC Health Commissioner Oxiris Barbot.  Before Barbot left the department,  Varma was described as a “shadow commissioner” for COVID-19 matters.

In September 2020, Varma was involved in NYC’s opening of a laboratory that prioritized testing for city residents. In December of 2020, Varma said New York City was monitoring wastewater and sewers to find COVID-19 clusters before they appear through patient testing.

After a new variant of COVID-19 called B.1.526 was identified in February of 2021 as likely originating in NYC, Varma said preliminary analysis of the variant showed it was likely more infectious, but New Yorkers did not need to take additional precautions.

Varma is the architect of the NYC plans for the public school system during the COVID-19 crisis, including assessing the risk factors for keeping schools partially opened in January 2021 as citywide positivity rates climbed. In March 2021, the journal Pediatrics published a peer-reviewed study authored by Varma about COVID-19 transmission rates in NYC schools between October and December of 2020. The study showed virus transmission rates remained low within in-person classes, with 191 of 36,000 students and staff quarantined after exposure to COVID-19 testing positive for a transmission rate of .5%.

Recognition and awards
In 2010, Varma was recognized as the U.S. Public Health Service Physician Researcher of the Year. In 2011, he received the Public Health Service Distinguished Service Medal, the highest decoration of the Department of Health and Human Services United States Public Health Service Commissioned Corps. In 2017, he was awarded Physician Leader of the Year. In 2018 he received the Public Health Service Meritorious Service Medal.

Selected works
Varma has authored 140 scientific manuscripts, six essays, and one book.

Some of his peer-reviewed works include:

References 

Year of birth missing (living people)
Living people
University of California, San Diego School of Medicine alumni
Harvard College alumni